Ottaviano della Raverta or Ottaviano della Rovere (died 1561) was a Roman Catholic prelate who served as Bishop of Terracina, Priverno e Sezze (1545–1561), twice the Apostolic Nuncio to Spain (1560 and 1561), and Apostolic Nuncio to Switzerland (1553–1560).

Biography
On 27 November 1545, Ottaviano della Raverta was appointed during the papacy of Pope Paul III as Bishop of Terracina, Priverno e Sezze.
In 1553, he was appointed during the papacy of Pope Julius III as Apostolic Nuncio to Switzerland; he resigned on 28 November 1560. 
In Jun 1561, he was appointed Apostolic Nuncio to Spain and resigned soon after in Oct 1561.
On 10 March 1560, he was once again appointed during the papacy of Pope Pius IV as Apostolic Nuncio to Spain; he resigned in October 1561.
He served as Bishop of Terracina, Priverno e Sezze until his death in October 1561.

References

External links and additional sources
 (for Chronology of Bishops) 
 (for Chronology of Bishops) 
 (for Chronology of Bishops) 
 (for Chronology of Bishops) 
 (for Chronology of Bishops) 
 (for Chronology of Bishops) 

16th-century Italian Roman Catholic bishops
Bishops appointed by Pope Paul III
Bishops appointed by Pope Julius III
Bishops appointed by Pope Pius IV
1561 deaths
Apostolic Nuncios to Spain
Apostolic Nuncios to Switzerland
Year of birth missing